Big Sandy is a  census-designated place (CDP) located in McDowell County, West Virginia, United States. As of the 2010 census, its population is 168. The town's name comes from the Big Sandy River, a major tributary of the Ohio River which forms the boundary between West Virginia and Kentucky.

References

External links 
Fall River Elementary School

Census-designated places in McDowell County, West Virginia
Census-designated places in West Virginia